Zardgah (also Romanized as Zardgāh; also known as Zīāratgāh and Zīyāratgāh) is a village in Kavir Rural District, Deyhuk District, Tabas County, South Khorasan Province, Iran. At the 2006 census, 17 families constituted a total population of 59.

References 

Populated places in Tabas County